The men's 20 kilometres walk event at the 1989 Summer Universiade was held in Duisburg on 25 August 1989.

Results

References

Athletics at the 1989 Summer Universiade
1989